Taleh Tut or Talah Tut may refer to:
 Taleh Tut, Dasht-e Hor
 Taleh Tut, Khaneh Shur